Plau am See is a town in the Ludwigslust-Parchim district, in Mecklenburg-Western Pomerania, Germany. It is situated 28 km east of Parchim, and 29 km west of Waren.

Around 1235 the city was called Plawe, that being the Polabian field name for the place where rafting is practiced. The name lasted until the 16th century and was then written according to its German phonetic form Plau. On 11 January 1994, the name of the city was modified by the addition of am See (on Lake) to remove confusion with the similarly named towns of Plaue, Plauen and Plaue.

At the edge of town, there is a protected forest habitat named Plauer Stadtwald (literally: Plau city forest). Among the sights in town are a historic church building, the ruins of the Burg Plau castle and a bridge that may be vertically lifted to allow boats on the channel below to pass through.

People 
 Anna of Mecklenburg-Schwerin (1484-1525), by marriage Landgravine of Hesse.
 Friedrich Lange (1834-1875), German artist and painter
 Friedrich Bohndorff (1848-after 1894), German researcher and ornithologist
 Alfred Brunswig (1877-1927), German philosopher
 Peter Paetzold (born 1935), German chemist

References

External links

 Official website 

Cities and towns in Mecklenburg
Ludwigslust-Parchim
1226 establishments in Europe
Populated places established in the 13th century